is a Japanese freestyle skier active since 2003 who represented Japan at the 2010 Winter Olympics. Nishi won a bronze medal in dual moguls at the 2011 FIS Freestyle World Ski Championships.

References 

1985 births
Living people
Japanese male freestyle skiers
Olympic freestyle skiers of Japan
Freestyle skiers at the 2010 Winter Olympics
Freestyle skiers at the 2014 Winter Olympics
Freestyle skiers at the 2018 Winter Olympics
People from Kawasaki, Kanagawa
21st-century Japanese people